Zuylen Castle (Dutch: Slot Zuylen - ) is a Dutch castle at the village of Oud-Zuilen just north of the city of Utrecht. It is located along the river Vecht at the southern end of the Vechtstreek.

The castle was originally built in the 13th century by lord van Suilen en Anholt as a simple donjon. In 1422 during the Hook and Cod wars the castle was completely demolished. In 1510 rebuilding started. In 1752 the castle was modified for the last time. It holds a tapestry by the Delft carpet weaver Maximiliaan van der Gught.  Its past inhabitants include Steven van der Hagen and Belle van Zuylen.

References 
M. Bous, A. Estourgie, T. Fafianie et al. (2007), Maarssen. Geschiedenis en architectuur, Kerkebosch, Zeist/SPOU, Utrecht, pages 331–344, 
J.E.A.L. Struick, Zuilen. Utrecht, Het Spectrum, 1973. 122 p.
Kransber, D. & H. Mils, Kastelengids van Nederland, middeleeuwen, Bussem 1979
Kalkwiek, K.A., A.I.J.M. Schellart, H.P.H. Jansen & P.W. Geudeke, Atlas van de Nederlandse kastelen, Alphen aan den Rijn 1980
Helsdingen, H.W. van, Gids voor de Nederlandse kastelen en buitenplaatsen, Amsterdam 1966
Tromp, H.M.J., Kijk op kastelen Amsterdam 1979

External links 

 Website of Zuylen Castle

Historic house museums in the Netherlands
Castles in Utrecht (province)
Museums in Utrecht (province)
Rijksmonuments in Utrecht (province)
Buildings and structures in Stichtse Vecht